Velimir "Bata" Živojinović (5 June 1933 – 22 May 2016) was a Yugoslav and Serbian actor and politician. He appeared in more than 340 films and TV series, and is regarded as one of the best actors in former Yugoslavia.

Early life
Živojinović (nicknamed Bata) was born in the village of Koraćica under the Kosmaj mountain near Mladenovac, at the time Kingdom of Yugoslavia (now Serbia). His father, Dragoljub, was an official and his mother Tiosava was a housewife. He had two sisters, Stanka and Nada, and grew up in a patriarchal household. A conflict between Dragoljub and the Chetniks during World War II forced the family to move to Belgrade. The family lived in Crveni Krst.

Young Bata often went with his friends to the cinema, which sparked his interest in acting. Loitering around the "20th October" cinema, he watched AKUD Branko Krsmanović, a Belgrade troupe, through the window for several days until he was welcomed inside. There he befriended Soja Jovanović, instrumental in the developing of Bata's love for acting, Rade Marković, Olivera Marković, Mića Tomić, and Bata Paskaljević. After graduating from acting schools in Niš and Novi Sad, he enrolled at the Drama Academy in Belgrade.

Career 
Živojinović preferred acting in theatre to acting on screen, and made his screen debut in the 1955 film Pesma sa Kumbare. He played both heroes and villains and switched between leading and supporting roles. The zenith of his popularity came with World War II-themed Partisan films in the 1970s. One of his best known films from that period was Walter Defends Sarajevo (Valter brani Sarajevo), which gained major success and cult following in China.

Politics 
In 1990 he was elected for the Serbian Parliament, as a member of the Socialist Party of Serbia. He was a candidate in the September–October 2002 presidential election, receiving 3.27% of the popular vote.

Illness and death 
Živojinović had a heart attack in October 2006 and suffered from gangrene in his right foot for about three years afterwards. Doctors initially wanted to amputate the limb, but he traveled to Cuba, where his daughter lives, and within the 25 days that he spent being treated there, was cured of the gangrene by Doctor Montekin, who has also treated Venezuelan President Hugo Chávez.

On 4 July 2012 he suffered a severe stroke and was transported to a hospital specializing in cerebrovascular diseases called Sveti Sava in Belgrade. He was treated in the intensive care unit and was reported to be in critical condition. Reports also stated that after the stroke he was in a coma for two days. He remained in critical condition in the hospital for about three weeks. After treatment for the stroke, he was discharged from the hospital, but reported to not be able to walk without assistance and that it was difficult for him to speak.

On 6 May 2016, after being transferred from Sveti Sava hospital to "KBC Dedinje", he was subject of an emergency surgery which, in order to stop his gangrene, resulted in a leg amputation. He died on 22 May 2016 in Belgrade.

Personal life 
Živojinović was married to Julijana "Lula" since 1960. They had a daughter, Jelena, and son, Miljko, and six grandchildren. His wife died on December 20, 2019 aged 80.

Živojinović was a close friend with Croatian actor Boris Dvornik until the Croatian War. In 1991 the two renounced each other in a series of open letters, which was a gesture often seen as symbolic of the breakup of Yugoslavia. In 2004 it was reported that the two men tried to reconcile. In 2006, the two men publicly reconciled on TV via a video link between Split and Belgrade. The actor said that "In the last few years there hasn't been hatred between us", and Dvornik completed the sentence "only a misunderstanding".

Awards and honours 
Živojinović was awarded Golden Arena for Best Actor at the Pula Film Festival, the most prestigious film award in the SFR Yugoslavia, three times: in 1965, 1967 and 1972. He won the award for Best Actor at the 11th Moscow International Film Festival in 1979 for his role in Moment. In 1981 he was a member of the jury at the 12th Moscow International Film Festival.

He was the recipient of the October Award of the City of Belgrade in 1972, and the 7th July Award of Serbia in 1981. In August 1993, he was awarded Life Achievement Award "Slavica". In 2016 he received the life achievement award Beogradski pobednik (Belgrade Victor).

Selected filmography 

 Pesma sa Kumbare (1955) - Velja iz Belog Potoka
 Klisura (1956) - Ajkin brat ... drvoseca
 Poslednji kolosek (1956) - Sofer
 Cipelice na asfaltu (1958) - Mladic (uncredited)
 Subotom uvece (1957) - (segment "Doktor")
 Mali covek (1957) - Mladic na zabavi
 Rafal u nebo (1958) - Cetnik koljac
 Te noci (1958) - Pijani slikar
 Dubrowsky (1959) - Russian Soldier
 Train Without a Timetable (1959) - Duje
 Vetar je stao pred zoru (1959) - Agent policije
 Dilizansa snova (1960) - Vasilije
 Atomic War Bride (1960)
 Signal Over the City (1960) - Toso
 Uzavreli grad (1961) - Monter Luka
 Pesma (1961) - Djordje
 Dr (1962) - Dr. Milorad Cvijovic
 Kozara (1962) - Sorga
 Krst Rakoc (1962) - Beli
 Double Circle (1963) - Pavle
 Radopolje (1963) - Bozina
 Thundering Mountains (1963) - Porucnik Kostic
 Zemljaci (1963) - Jole
 Muskarci (1963) - Lale
 Covek iz hrastove sume (1964) - Profesor
 Put oko sveta (1964) - Sava Cvetkovic
 Narodni poslanik (1964) - Ivkovic
 Dobra kob (1964) - Marko
 Three (1965) - Milos Bojanic
 Laznivka (1965) - Bonivan
 Flaming Frontier (1965) - Jim Potter
 Neprijatelj (1965) - Slobodan Antic
 Looking Into the Eyes of the Sun (1966) - Mornar
 Pre rata (1966) - G. Novakovic
 The Dream (1966) - Lazar
 Povratak (1966) - Al Kapone
 Glineni golub (1966) - Kosta
 I Even Met Happy Gypsies (Skupljači perja) (1967) - Mirta
 Noz (1967) - Islednik Marko
 Praznik (1967) - Major
 The Birch Tree (1967) - Marko Labudan
  (1967) - Djino
 Diverzanti (1967) - Korcagin
 Brat doktora Homera (1968) - Simon Petrovic
 Visnja na Tasmajdanu (1968) - Profesor
 Uzrok smrti ne pominjati (1968) - Mitar Velimirovic
 Bekstva (1968) - Viktor
 Operacija Beograd (1968) - Pukovnik Vili Fuks
 It Rains in My Village (1968) - Ispovednik
 Ima ljubavi, nema ljubavi (1968)
 Oseka (1969) - Kum
 The Bridge (1969) - Tigar
 Battle of Neretva (1969) - Stole
 Krvava bajka (1969) - Marisav Petrovic
 Zarki (1970)
 Moja luda glava (1971) - Andrija
 Dorucak sa djavolom (1971) - Bogoljub - Bata Radulaski
 Opklada (1971)
 Zvezde su oci ratnika (1972) - Ucitelj Mladen
 Walter Defends Sarajevo (1972) - Valter
 I Bog stvori kafansku pevacicu (1972) - Ratomir Jovanic - Ratko
 Traces of a Black Haired Girl (1972) - Sinter
 The Master and Margaret (1972) - Korovjev
 The Battle of Sutjeska (1973) - Nikola
 Bombasi (1973) - Djoka
 Mirko i Slavko (1973) - Komandant
 The Dervish and Death (1974) - Muselim
 Kosava (1974) - Beli
 Hell River (1974) - Braka
 Crveni udar (1974) - Ico
 Povest o dobrih ljudeh (1975) - Peter Kostrca
 Crvena zemlja (1975) - Muzikant
 Anno Domini 1573 (1975) - Ilija Gregorić
 Naivko (1975) - Zile Akademac
 Beach Guard in Winter (1976) - Ljubicin otac
 Vrhovi Zelengore (1976) - Boro
 Povratak otpisanih (1976) - Cetnicki oficir
 Gruppenbild mit Dame (1977) - Bogakov
 Group Portrait with a Lady (1977) - Bogakov
 Ljubavni zivot Budimira Trajkovica (1977) - Vozac GSP-a
 Bestije (1977) - Bute
 Hajka (1977) - Vojvoda Juzbasic
 The Dog Who Loved Trains (1977) - Kauboj
 Foolish Years (1977) - Dr. Nedeljkovic
 Nije nego (1978) - Profesor matematike Herceg
 Stici pre svitanja (1978) - Obren
 Moment (1978) - Arsen
 The Tiger (1978) - Direktor
 Radio Vihor zove Andjeliju (1979) - Petrinja
 Drugarcine (1979) - Kosta 
 Usijanje (1979) - Zandarm
 Partizanska eskadrila (1979) - Vuk
 Pozorisna veza (1980) - Milan, visi inspektor
 Special Treatment (1980) - Direktor
 Rad na odredjeno vreme (1980) - Milutin
 Snovi, zivot, smrt Filipa Filipovica (1980)
 Erogena zona (1981) - Pera 'Zver'
 Crveniot konj (1981) - Boris Tusev
 High Voltage (1981) - Cukic
 Dorotej (1981) - Dadara
 Sesta brzina (1981) - Svetolik Trpkovic 'Pufta'
 The Fall of Italy (1981) - Grgo Kusturin
 Sok od sljiva (1981) - Uca
 Lov u mutnom (1981) - Paja 'Glavonja'
 Laf u srcu (1981) - Doktor
 The Promising Boy (1981) - Masin otac
 Idemo dalje (1982) - Sopenhauer
 13. jul (1982) - Stevanov otac
 Progon (1982) - Domacin Joca
  (1982) - Dr. Dusan Arandjelovic
 Moj tata na odredjeno vreme (1982) - Milutin Rakocevic
 Balkan Express (1983) - Stojcic
 Kakav deda takav unuk (1983) - Dr. Nedeljkovic
 Stepenice za nebo (1983) - Komsija
 Halo taxi (1983) - Suger
 Jos ovaj put (1983) - Dzek
 Igmanski mars (1983) - Badza
 Great Transport (1983) - Kosta
 Timocka buna (1983) - Kapetan Sibin
 Idi mi, dodji mi (1983) - Dr. Nedeljkovic
 Secerna vodica (1983) - Major Djuric
 Pejzazi u magli (1984) - Ivanov otac
 Maturanti (Pazi sta radis) (1984) - Funkcioner
 Unseen Wonder (1984) - Otac Makarije
 In the Jaws of Life (1984) - Trokrilni
 Sta je s tobom, Nina (1984) - Miloje
 Opasni trag (1984) - Inspektor Kosta Markovic
 Balkan Spy (1984) - Palacinkar
 The End of the War (1984) - Bajo Lazarević
 Mala pljačka vlaka (1984) - Todor Strasni
 No problem (1984) - Brenin Menadzer
 Groznica ljubavi (1984) - Jordan Cvetkovic
 Cao inspektore (1985) - Boki
 Nije lako sa muskarcima (1985) - Milos
 I to ce proci (1985) - Kapetan Mika
 Ada (1985) - Mladen
 Zivot je lep (1985) - Visoko pozicionirani drug
 Drzanje za vazduh (1986) - Buzdovan
 Debeli i mrsavi (1986) - Aco Popara - Zver
 Sest dana juna (1986) - Pilot 1
 Zikina dinastija (1986) - Dr. Nedeljkovic
 U zatvoru (1986) - Upravnik
 The Promised Land (1986) - Markan, predsjednik zadruge
 Osveta (1986) - Milivoje Pekar
 Sekula i njegove zene (1986) - Ceda
  (1986) - Marko Mrgud
 Druga Zikina dinastija (1986) - Dr. Nedeljkovic
 Majstor i Sampita (1986) - Jova
 Razvod na odredjeno vreme (1986) - Milutin Rakocevic
 Miss (1986) - Kokos
 Dobrovoljci (1986) - Vatrogasac
 Days to Remember (1987) - Onkel Savo
 Oktoberfest (1987) - Skoblar
 Lutalica (1987) - Gazda Daca
 The Felons (1987) - Preiskovalni
 Let's Fall in Love (1987-1989, part 1, 2) - Komandir Milanovic
 Vuk Karadžić (1987-1988, TV Series) - Jakov Nenadovic
 A Better Life (1987-1991, TV Series) - Aleksandar 'Macola' Kostic
 Vanbracna putovanja (1988) - Gerasim Miletic
 Vikend na mrtovci (1988) - Generalen direktor
 Tajna manastirske rakije (1988) - Abdullah the Great
 Tesna koza 3 (1988) - Sotir Milivojevic
 Sulude godine (1988) - Dr. Nedeljkovic / Dr Smiljanic
 Spijun na stiklama (1988) - Ruzic
 Ransom (1988)
  (1988) - Gospodin Mihailo
 Balkan ekspres 2 (1989) - Stojko
 Atoski vrtovi - preobrazenje (1989) - Komesar 
 War and Remembrance (1989, TV Mini-Series) - Jewish Partisan Leader
 The Fall of Rock and Roll (1989) - Krsta Klatic-Klaja
 Vampiri su medju nama (1989) - Boki
 Battle of Kosovo (1989) - Srbin Hamza
 Sex-partijski neprijatelj br. 1 (1991) - Ciganin Sekula
 Aliens are to Blame for Everything (1991) - Boki
  (1991) - Ceda
 Holiday in Sarajevo (1991) - Inspektor Felini
 The Original of the Forgery (1991) - Vujic
 Bracna putovanja (1991) - Gerasim Miletic
 Prokleta je Amerika (1992) - Kamiondzija Radovan
 Velika frka (1992) - Sima
 Dama koja ubija (1992) - Boki
 Three Tickets to Hollywood (1993) - Mrgud
 Pun mesec nad Beogradom (1993) - Aleksin otac
 Slatko od snova (1994) - Baks
 The End of Obrenović Dynasty (1995, TV Series) - Aleksa Novakovic
 Tamna je noc (1995) - Komandant policijskog odreda
 Treca sreca (1995) - Ujka Zivota
 Pretty Village, Pretty Flame (1996) - Gvozden
 Dovidjenja u Cikagu (1996) - Boki
 Balkanska pravila (1997) - Sef
 Ptice koje ne polete (1997) - Lugar Zdravko
 The Wounds (1998) - Covek na tenku
 Kupi mi Eliota (1998) - Adam Tabakera
 Barking at the Stars (1998) - Bozovic
 Cabaret Balkan (1998) - The Bosnian Serb Father, the Bus Driver
 The Dagger (1999) - Nicifor Jugovic
 The White Suit (1999) - Gospodin
 Ranjena zemlja (1999) - Aleksic
 Shadows of Memories (2000) - Ljuba Radovanovic
 War Live (2000) - Tatula
 Seljaci (2001) - Jeremija
 Sve je za ljude (2001) - Jeremija
 Frozen Stiff (2002) - Stanislav
 Amir (2002) - Amirjev oce
 Ivkova Slava (2005) - Mirko
 Made in YU (2005) - Farfar
 Princ od papira (2007) - Opasni cica
 The Sisters (2011, TV Movie) - Deda Rade
 My Beautiful Country (2012) - Special Guest
 Led (2012) - Deda Zivotije

See also 
 List of Yugoslavian films
 Politics of Serbia

References

External links 

 

1933 births
2016 deaths
Politicians from Jagodina
20th-century Serbian male actors
21st-century Serbian male actors
Serbian actor-politicians
Male actors from Belgrade
Golden Arena winners
Members of the National Assembly (Serbia)
Candidates for President of Serbia
Politicians from Belgrade
Serbian male film actors
Serbian male stage actors
Socialist Party of Serbia politicians
Yugoslav male film actors
Deaths from gangrene
Burials at Belgrade New Cemetery